Access Bank South Africa, formerly known as Grobank Limited, and Bank of Athens (South Africa) before that, is a commercial bank in South Africa. It is licensed by the Reserve Bank of South Africa, the central bank and national banking regulator. The bank began commercial operations in June 2021, following the acquisition of a retail commercial banking license.

Location
The bank's headquarters are located at Building Number 3, Inanda Greens Business Park, 54 Wierda Road West, Wierda Valley, Sandton, South Africa. The geographic coordinates of the bank's headquarters are: 26°06'49.0"S, 28°03'35.0"E (Latitude:-26.113611; Longitude:28.059722).

Overview
Access Bank South Africa is a subsidiary of Access Bank Group, a financial services conglomerate based in Nigeria, with subsidiaries in nine sub-Saharan countries, the United Kingdom and the United Arab Emirates. The group also maintains representative offices in China, India and Lebanon. The group's shares of stock are listed on the Nigerian Stock Exchange under the symbol ACCESS. As of 31 December 2021, Access Bank Group had total assets in excess of US$28 billion.

History
Bank of Athens (South Africa) started operations in 1947. In October 2018, Grobank Limited concluded the acquisition of 99.81 percent shareholding in Bank of Athens (South Africa). The bank rebranded to Grobank Limited and focused its activities to lending to the agricultural sector.

In March 2021, Access Bank Group paid an estimated US$60 million to acquire a controlling interest in Grobank Limited. Access Bank went further and obtained regulatory approval to rebrand Grobank to Access Bank South Africa and to convert to a retail commercial bank. It opened to customers under those new terms in June 2021.

Governance
The managing director and CEO is Sugendhree Reddy.

See also

 List of banks in South Africa

References

External links
  Official Website

Banks of South Africa
Access Bank Group
Companies based in Johannesburg
Banks established in 1947
Economy of South Africa
South African companies established in 1947